Thomas Tanner (died 1401) of Wells, Somerset, was an English politician.

He was a Member (MP) of the Parliament of England for Wells in April 1384, January 1390 and 1399.

References 

14th-century births
1401 deaths
English MPs April 1384
Politicians from Somerset
English MPs January 1390
English MPs 1399